RecRec Music was a Swiss independent record label created in 1983 by Daniel Waldner. The label was modeled on, and affiliated to, the British independent record label Recommended Records, but remained financially independent. The label went bankrupt in 1997 after the death of Waldner in 1995.

History
In 1979 Veit Stauffer and Daniel Waldner founded RecRec Zürich in Switzerland, after suggestions from Chris Cutler that they establish a record distribution company similar to the British independent record label Recommended Records that Cutler had created the previous year. RecRec Music, RecRec's record label, was created by Waldner in 1983, and built up a roster of over 30 bands and musicians.

On 3 September 1995, Waldner and his son, Valentin died in an accident in the Swiss Alps. RecRec Music continued to operate, but began making losses and was declared bankrupt in May 1997. The label was split into two companies, RecRec-Shop, the record shop, and RecRec Medien AG, the distributor, with two new labels, Make-Up and Make-Up Your World. The companies continue to operate today, although with a different musical emphasis to that of RecRec Music.

RecRec Music roster

RecRec Music released music by over 30 bands and groups, including:
After Dinner
Bob Ostertag
Camberwell Now
Etron Fou Leloublan
Ferdinand Richard
Fred Frith
Goz of Kermeur
Massacre
Negativland
Nimal
Pale Nudes
Skeleton Crew
Tenko
The Ex
The Hat Shoes

See also
Recommended Records
Fred Records
List of record labels

External links
RecRec Store. RecRec history. 
Discogs. RecRec Music.
Squidco. RecRec discography.

Swiss independent record labels
Record labels established in 1983
Record labels disestablished in 1997
1983 establishments in Switzerland
Alternative rock record labels
Experimental music record labels